Targets is a 1968 American crime thriller film directed by Peter Bogdanovich, produced by Roger Corman, and written by Polly Platt and Bogdanovich, with cinematography by László Kovács.

The film depicts two parallel narratives which converge during the climax: one follows Bobby Thompson (Tim O'Kelly), a seemingly ordinary and wholesome young man who embarks on an unprovoked killing spree; the other depicts Byron Orlok (Boris Karloff in his last straight dramatic role), an iconic horror film actor who is disillusioned by real-life violence and is contemplating retirement.

Targets received generally positive reviews. It was included in the 2003 book 1001 Movies You Must See Before You Die.

Plot
Byron Orlok, an aged, embittered horror movie actor, abruptly announces his decision to retire and return to his native England to live out his final days. Orlok considers himself outdated because he believes that people are no longer frightened by old-fashioned horror, citing real-life news stories as more horrifying than anything in his films. However, after much persuasion, particularly from young director Sammy Michaels, Orlok agrees to make a final in-person promotional appearance at a Reseda drive-in theater before leaving Hollywood for good.

Bobby Thompson is a young, quiet, clean-cut insurance agent and Vietnam War veteran who lives in the suburban San Fernando Valley area with his wife and his parents. Thompson is also deeply disturbed and an obsessive gun collector, but his family takes little notice. One morning, after his father leaves for work, Thompson murders his wife, his mother, and a delivery boy at his home. That afternoon, Thompson continues the killing spree, shooting people in passing cars from atop an oil storage tank that sits alongside a heavily-travelled freeway. When an employee at the storage tank comes up to investigate the gunshots, Thompson shoots him as well. Leaving some of his guns and ammo at the crime scene, Thompson flees to the very same drive-in theater where Orlok is set to appear that evening.

After sunset, Thompson kills the theater's projectionist and perches himself on the framing inside the screen tower. While the Orlok film is shown, Thompson aims and shoots at the patrons in and around the parking lot via a hole in the projection screen. After Thompson wounds Orlok's secretary, Jenny, Orlok confronts Thompson, who is disoriented by Orlok's simultaneous appearance before him and on the large movie screen behind him, allowing the actor to disarm Thompson using his walking cane. Looking at the now-defeated Thompson, a visibly shaken Orlok remarks, "Is that what I was afraid of?" Moments later, police officers arrive to arrest Thompson for the murders he has committed; as they lead him away, Thompson states with apparent satisfaction that he "hardly ever missed."

Cast

Production
The character and actions of Bobby Thompson are patterned after Charles Whitman, who perpetrated the University of Texas tower shooting in 1966. The character of Byron Orlok, named after Max Schreck's vampire Count Orlok in 1922's Nosferatu, was based on Karloff himself, with a fictional component of being embittered with the movie business and wanting to retire. The role was Karloff's last appearance in a major American film.

Karloff gives a celebrated 100-second single-take performance of W. Somerset Maugham's retelling of the Babylonian fable Appointment in Samarra.

In the film's finale at a drive-in theater, Orlok—the old-fashioned, traditional screen monster who always obeyed the rules—confronts the new, realistic, nihilistic late-1960s "monster" in the shape of a clean-cut, unassuming multiple murderer.

Bogdanovich got the chance to make Targets because Boris Karloff owed studio head Roger Corman two days' work. Corman told Bogdanovich he could make any film he liked provided he used Karloff and stayed under budget. In addition, Bogdanovich used clips from Corman's Napoleonic-era thriller The Terror in the movie.  The clips from The Terror feature Jack Nicholson, Dick Miller and Boris Karloff. A brief clip of Howard Hawks' 1931 film The Criminal Code featuring Karloff was also used. Polly Platt was the film's production designer, in addition to developing the story, and it was her idea to set the ending at a drive-in movie theater.

Bogdanovich has said that Samuel Fuller provided generous help on the screenplay and refused to accept either a fee or a screen credit, so Bogdanovich named his own character Sammy Michaels (Fuller's middle name was Michael) in tribute. Fuller advised Bogdanovich to save as much money in the film's budget as possible for the film to have an action-packed conclusion.

Release
American International Pictures offered to release, but Bogdanovich wanted to try to see if the film could get a deal with a major studio. It was seen by Robert Evans of Paramount Pictures, who bought it for $150,000, giving Corman an instant profit on the movie before it was even released.

Although the film was written and production photography completed in late 1967, it was not released until after the assassination of Martin Luther King Jr. and that of Robert F. Kennedy in the summer of 1968, thus having some topical relevance to then-current events. Nevertheless, it was not very successful at the box office.

However, Bogdanovich, who appears in the film as a young writer-director, credits it with getting him noticed by the studios, which in turn led to his directing three very successful studio films (The Last Picture Show, What's Up, Doc?, and Paper Moon) in the early 1970s.

Around five years after release, in March 1973, New Zealand refused to issue a 'certificate of approval' for the film's trailer on the basis that it was "contrary to public order and decency."

Critical reception
On the review aggregator website Rotten Tomatoes, Targets has an approval rating of 90% based on 29 reviews, with an average rating of 7.7/10. The website's critical consensus reads: "A startling directorial debut by Peter Bogdanovich mixes an homage to Boris Karloff horror films with a timely sniper story to create a thriller with modern baggage and old school shock and awe."

Howard Thompson of The New York Times called the film an "original and brilliant melodrama", and concluded that "Targets scores an unnerving bullseye." Dave Kehr of The Chicago Reader called the film "an interesting response to the demands of low-budget genre filmmaking." Variety wrote of the film: "Aware of the virtue of implied violence, Bogdanovich conveys moments of shock, terror, suspense and fear." In a retrospective review of the film, Geoff Andrew of Time Out called it "a fascinatingly complex commentary on American mythology, exploring the relationship between the inner world of the imagination and the outer world of violence and paranoia, both of which were relevant to contemporary American traumas."

Writing for the Chicago Sun-Times, critic Roger Ebert gave the film two-and-a-half stars out of four, and wrote that "Targets isn't a very good film, but it is an interesting one." He called Karloff's performance "fascinating" but noted that the film may have been "more direct and effective" without his scenes. A review of the film published by Time stated that "Targets eventually falls victim to artistic overkill."

Stanley Kauffmann of The New Republic wrote, "Targets showed considerable skill, but was trapped in Movieland, in more than subject matter". John Simon wrote- "Targets handled a valid subject but in a trashy way."

In 2020, Quentin Tarantino called Targets "the most political movie Corman ever made since The Intruder. And forty years later it's still one of the strongest cries for gun control in American cinema. The film isn't a thriller with a social commentary buried inside of it (the normal Corman model), it's a social commentary with a thriller buried inside of it... It was one of the most powerful films of 1968 and one of the greatest directorial debuts of all time. And I believe the best film ever produced by Roger Corman."

See also
 List of American films of 1968
 1965 Highway 101 sniper attack

References

External links

 
 

1968 films
1960s crime thriller films
American crime thriller films
1960s English-language films
Films about actors
Films about mass murder
Films about snipers
Films about veterans
Films directed by Peter Bogdanovich
Films produced by Roger Corman
Films set in a movie theatre
Films set in Los Angeles
Films with screenplays by Peter Bogdanovich
Matricide in fiction
Paramount Pictures films
Uxoricide in fiction
1960s American films